The Wolfson Centre for Age-Related Diseases (CARD) is based at the Guy's Hospital campus of King's College London, England. Research at the Wolfson CARD falls into three main Themes:
	Chronic Pain and Migraine
	Spinal Cord and Brain Repair
	Hearing Loss and Sensory Systems

The centre is currently co-headed by Professor Elizabeth Bradbury and Professor Susan Duty.

References

External links
Official Website

King's College London
Medical research institutes in the United Kingdom
Research institutes in London